Pentapeptide repeats are a family of sequence motifs found in multiple tandem copies in protein molecules. Pentapeptide repeat proteins are found in all species, but they are found in many copies in cyanobacterial genomes. The repeats were first identified by Black and colleagues in the hglK protein. The later Bateman et al. showed that a large family of related pentapeptide repeat proteins existed. The function of these repeats is uncertain in most proteins. However, in the MfpA protein a DNA gyrase inhibitor it has been suggested that the pentapeptide repeat structure mimics the structure of DNA.  The repeats form a regular right handed four sided beta helix structure known as the Rfr-fold.

Sequence features

The pentapeptide repeat is a feature seen in protein sequence. It can be approximately described using the 1-letter amino acid code as A(D/N)LXX, where X can be any amino acid . This repeating sequence can be seen in multiple sequence alignments and dot plots of proteins such as HglK. The central position in the pentapeptide repeat is usually a leucine and has been designated as position i. The two previous positions are known as i-1 and i-2. Position i-2 is usually an alanine. The two subsequent positions are denoted i+1 and i+2. The side chains of positions i-2 and i point into the hydrophobic interior of the protein while the side chains of positions i-1, i+1 and i+2 are exposed on the surface of the proteins.

Structure

Pentapeptide repeats were initially predicted from sequence to possess a right handed beta helix with three sides. The first crystal structure of a pentapeptide repeat protein was the MfpA protein solved by Hegde and colleagues. It showed that pentapeptide repeat proteins (PRPs) possessed a four sided beta helix structure. Four repeats make up one turn of a solenoid like structure. The structures of eight different proteins have been solved to date.

References 

Protein families